Deelstra is a Dutch surname. Notable people with the surname include:

Andrea Deelstra (born 1985), Dutch long-distance runner
Atje Keulen-Deelstra (1938–2013), Dutch speed skater

Dutch-language surnames